Luciano Cafaro (born 5 February 1962), known as Lou Cafaro, is an Australian professional welter/light middle/middle/super middle/light heavy/cruiserweight boxer of the 1980s and '90s who won the Australian middleweight title, Australian super middleweight title, Oriental and Pacific Boxing Federation (OPBF) super middleweight title, and Commonwealth super middleweight title, and was a challenger for the World Boxing Council (WBC) International super middleweight title against Kid Milo, his professional fighting weight varied from , i.e. welterweight to , i.e. cruiserweight.

Professional boxing record

References

External links

1962 births
Cruiserweight boxers
Light-heavyweight boxers
Light-middleweight boxers
Living people
Middleweight boxers
Place of birth missing (living people)
Sportspeople from Perth, Western Australia
Super-middleweight boxers
Welterweight boxers
Australian male boxers
Commonwealth Boxing Council champions